The 1914 All-Ireland Senior Hurling Championship Final was the twenty-seventh All-Ireland Final and the culmination of the 1914 All-Ireland Senior Hurling Championship, an inter-county hurling tournament for the top teams in Ireland.

Clare were the winners.

Monadrehid GAA Club refused a request from the Laois County Board for a contribution after the team reached the 1914 final. The club was using its money locally to deal with a player-welfare issue of their own.

References

 Corry, Eoghan, The GAA Book of Lists (Hodder Headline Ireland, 2005).
 Donegan, Des, The Complete Handbook of Gaelic Games (DBA Publications Limited, 2005).

1
All-Ireland Senior Hurling Championship Finals
Clare county hurling team matches
Laois county hurling team matches
All-Ireland Senior Hurling Championship Final
All-Ireland Senior Hurling Championship Final, 1914